The Jones Farm is a historic tobacco plantation house and farm located near Kenbridge, Lunenburg County, Virginia. It was built about 1846, and is a two-story, three bay, frame I-house with a rear ell dated to about 1835. It is sheathed in original weatherboard and has a side gable roof. It features a front porch with Greek Revival style characteristics. Also on the property are the contributing smokehouse, ice house, granary, storage barn, tobacco storage facility, dairy stable, corncrib, two chicken coops, five tobacco barns, three tenant farmhouses, and the sites of a well house and tool shed.

It was listed on the National Register of Historic Places in 1996.

References

Plantation houses in Virginia
Houses on the National Register of Historic Places in Virginia
Farms on the National Register of Historic Places in Virginia
Greek Revival houses in Virginia
Houses completed in 1846
Houses in Lunenburg County, Virginia
National Register of Historic Places in Lunenburg County, Virginia